Tshibalabala Kadima (born 18 January 1962) is a boxer from Zaire, who competed in the super-heavyweight (+ 91 kg) division at the 1988 Summer Olympics. Kadima lost his opening bout to Andreas Schnieders of West Germany. Kadima won the silver medal in the super-heavyweight division at the 1987 All-Africa Games, losing to Chris Odera of Kenya in the final.

1988 Olympic results
Below is the record of Tshibalabala Kadima, a super heavyweight boxer from Zaire who competed at the 1988 Seoul Olympics:

 Round of 32: lost to Andreas Schnieders (West Germany) referee stopped contest in the second round

References

1962 births
Living people
Super-heavyweight boxers
Olympic boxers of the Democratic Republic of the Congo
Boxers at the 1988 Summer Olympics
African Games silver medalists for DR Congo
African Games medalists in boxing
Democratic Republic of the Congo male boxers
Competitors at the 1987 All-Africa Games